Myroslav Mykhailovych Skoryk (13 July 1938 – 1 June 2020) was a Ukrainian composer and teacher. His music is contemporary in style and contains stylistic traits from Ukrainian folk traditions.

Skoryk was awarded the titles People's Artist of Ukraine and Hero of Ukraine.

Early life 
Myroslav Skoryk was born in Lviv, Ukraine, then a part of Poland on 13 July 1938. His parents were both educated in Austria at the University of Vienna and subsequently became educators. His father was a historian and an ethnographer, while his mother was a chemist. Although his parents did not have special musical training, his mother played piano and his father played the violin. Skoryk was exposed to music in the household from an early age. No less important was the fact that in his family was a well-known diva of the 20th century—Skoryk's great aunt was the Ukrainian soprano Solomiya Krushelnytska.

Skoryk entered the Lviv Music School in 1945, but two years later his family were deported to Siberia, where Myroslav grew up. The family did not return to Lviv until 1955.

Student years  

Between 1955 and 1960 Skoryk studied at the Lviv Conservatory, There he received training in musical composition and music theory; his teachers included Stanislav Liudkevych and Roman Simovych.

In 1960, Skoryk enrolled in the postgraduate research program at the Moscow Conservatory where he studied with the composer Dmitri Kabalevsky. He remained there for four years. During this time, Skoryk composed music in an array of styles: symphonic, chamber, and vocal. Some works from this period include the 'Suite in D Major for Strings', 'Sonata No. 1 for Violin and Piano', and 'Partita No. 1 for Strings' which quickly became popular, the 'Variations', 'Blues', and the popular 'Burlesque', which is performed in concert halls around the world. 'Burlesque' is a required work in some piano competitions, most notably the International Competition for Young Pianists in Memory of Vladimir Horowitz in Kyiv, and as teaching piece.

Teaching career 
In 1963 Skoryk became the youngest member of the National Union of Composers of Ukraine.

After graduating from the Moscow Conservatory in 1964, Skoryk, then 25, began his first teaching position, becoming Ukraine's youngest composition lecturer at the Lviv Conservatory, where he remained until 1966. He then accepted a position at the Kyiv Conservatory where he focused on teaching contemporary harmony techniques. His dissertation, completed in 1964, concentrated on the music of the Russian composer Sergei Prokofiev. Skoryk wrote a book, "Struktura i vyrazhalna pryroda akordyky v muzitsi XX stolittia" (The Structural Aspects of Chords in 20th Century Music) (Kyiv, 1983 Musical Ukraine Publishing House). His students included the composers Osvaldas Balakauskas, Ivan Karabyts and Yevhen Stankovych. Skoryk remained at the Kyiv Conservatory until 1988.

During his career, Skoryk was active within the National Union of Composers of Ukraine. He was co-chair of the union with Yevhen Stankovych from 2004 to 2010.

Later years
In 1996 Skoryk moved with his family to Australia and obtained Australian citizenship, but later he returned to live in Ukraine.

In April 2011 Skoryk was appointed as the artistic director of the Kyiv Opera, a position he held until 2016.

Skoryk died on 1 June 2020.

Music 

Skoryk was a composer, pianist and conductor. His works have been performed by ensembles and soloists that include the Leontovych Quartet, Oleh Krysa, Volodymyr Vynnytsky, Oleg Chmyr, Mykola Suk, Victor Markiw, and Alexander Slobodyanik. He was one of the recipients of the Ukraine's Shevchenko National Prize in 1987 for his Cello Concerto.

Awards 
People's Artist of Ukraine
Hero of Ukraine (Hero of Ukraine with the Order of the State (2008));

References

Sources

Further reading

External links 

  (includes audio files)
 
Skoryk in the Ukrainian Musicians' Directory
 
 

 
Ukrainian classical composers
1938 births
2020 deaths
Burials at Lychakiv Cemetery
Ukrainian music educators
Recipients of the title of Hero of Ukraine
Recipients of the Shevchenko National Prize
Academic staff of Lviv Conservatory
Ukrainian opera composers
20th-century classical composers
21st-century classical composers